Scoville Memorial Library may refer to:

Scoville Library, known also as Scoville Memorial Library, in Connecticut
Scoville Memorial Library (Carleton College)